DXO may refer to:

 Dextrorphan, a psychoactive drug of the morphinan chemical class which acts as an antitussive or cough suppressant and dissociative hallucinogen
 DxO Labs, a French software company that develops image processing software and maintains a website with technical measurements of lenses and cameras